This list presents the members of the Madrid Municipal Council in the 2011–2015 period, including substitutes:

References